Ross Els (born August 14, 1965) is an American football coach who is currently the special teams and linebackers coach for the Michigan State football team  He previously was the defensive coordinator for the Purdue Boilermakers football team and the linebackers coach for the Nebraska.  Els served as the head football coach at Hastings College in Hastings, Nebraska from 1997 to 2000, compiling a record of 32–9.

Head coaching record

References

External links
 Michigan State profile
 Colorado profile

1965 births
Living people
American football safeties
Colorado Buffaloes football coaches
Hastings Broncos football coaches
Michigan State Spartans football coaches
Nebraska Cornhuskers football coaches
Nebraska–Omaha Mavericks football coaches
Nebraska–Omaha Mavericks football players
Northern Iowa Panthers football coaches
New Mexico State Aggies football coaches
Ohio Bobcats football coaches
Purdue Boilermakers football coaches
High school football coaches in Nebraska